The Grammy Award for Best Spoken Word Album has been awarded since 1959. The award has had several minor name changes:
 In 1959 the award was known as Best Performance, Documentary or Spoken Word
 From 1960 to 1961 it was awarded as Best Performance – Documentary or Spoken Word (other than comedy)
 From 1962 to 1963 it was awarded as Best Documentary or Spoken Word Recording (other than comedy)
 From 1964 to 1965 it was awarded as Best Documentary, Spoken Word or Drama Recording (other than comedy)
 In 1966 it was awarded as Best Spoken Word or Drama Recording
 From 1967 to 1968 it was awarded as Best Spoken Word, Documentary or Drama Recording
 From 1969 to 1979 it was awarded as Best Spoken Word Recording 
 From 1980 to 1983 it returned to the title of Best Spoken Word, Documentary or Drama Recording
 From 1984 to 1991 it was awarded as Best Spoken Word or Non-Musical Recording
 From 1992 to 1997 it was awarded as Best Spoken Word or Non-Musical Album
 From 1998 to 2022 it was awarded as Best Spoken Word Album
 From 2023 it will be awarded as  Best Audio Book, Narration & Storytelling Recording. Poetry reading now has its own Grammy category, Best Spoken Word Poetry Album.

This category now also includes audio books and story telling. Up to and including 2022, it also included poetry reading.

Three US Presidents have won the award: Jimmy Carter (three times), Barack Obama (twice) and Bill Clinton. Additionally, recordings of John F. Kennedy and Franklin D. Roosevelt featured prominently in later works which won the award.  Four U.S. Senators have won: Barack Obama, Everett Dirksen, Al Franken (won prior to his election), and Hillary Clinton (won while active as First Lady). First Lady Michelle Obama also won the award, while no longer active as First Lady.

Years reflect the year in which the Grammy Awards were handed out, for a recording released in the previous year.

Recipients

See also
 Grammy Award for Best Spoken Word Album for Children

References 

 
Audio Book
Spoken Word Album
Spoken word albums
Album awards